Tetrolic acid (2-butynoic acid) is a short-chain unsaturated carboxylic acid, described by the formula . Salts and esters of tetrolic acid are known as tetrolates.

History 
The first reported synthesis of tetrolic acid is believed to be by German chemist Johann Georg Anton Geuther in 1871 as part of his work investigating the derivatives of ethyl acetoacetate.

Production 
Tetrolic acid is manufactured on a commercial scale by treatment of propyne with a strong base (to form an acetylide), followed by carbon dioxide:

Strong bases such as n-BuLi and  can be used.

Properties 
Tetrolic acid is highly soluble in polar solvents (water, ethanol) and can be recrystallized from non polar solvents (such as heptane, hexane or toluene). The compound is a white crystalline solid which can exist in two polymorphous crystalline forms.

The proton nuclear magnetic resonance (1H-NMR) spectrum in deuterated dimethyl sulfoxide shows a characteristic singlet peak at 1.99 ppm corresponding to the – protons.

Tetrolic acid sublimes at temperatures above 20°C, and should ideally be stored in a sealed container in a refrigerator.

Safety 
Tetrolic acid is thermally unstable at high temperatures. Testing using accelerated rate calorimetry (ARC) showed exothermic onset from 135 °C, precluding short-path distillation as a means of purification.

References 

Carboxylic acids
Alkyne derivatives